Here Comes the Navy (also known as Hey, Sailor) is a 1934 American romantic comedy film written by Earl Baldwin and Ben Markson and directed by Lloyd Bacon. The film stars James Cagney, Pat O'Brien, Gloria Stuart and Frank McHugh. Stuart was  Oscar-nominated 63 years later for another nautical epic, Titanic (1997).

Plot
Riveter "Chesty" O'Conner (James Cagney) and his best friend, "Droopy" (Frank McHugh), join the US Navy to annoy O'Connor's nemesis, Chief Petty Officer "Biff" Martin (Pat O'Brien). O'Conner gets himself court-martialled for being AWOL while visiting Martin's sister Dorothy (Gloria Stuart). Disgruntled at his treatment, O'Connor angrily derides the Navy and finds himself ostracized by his fellow sailors.

During gunnery practice, O'Conner helps put out a fire in a gun room and receives the Navy Cross medal, but is still determined to get out of the Navy. Later. O'Conner transfers to the US Naval Air Service and is assigned to the rigid airship . When the Macon tries to dock, Martin is accidentally caught on a guide rope and is hoisted into the air.  Despite orders, O'Conner climbs down the rope and saves Martin's life by parachuting both of them to the ground.

Later, at the wedding of O'Conner to Dorothy, Martin finds out that O'Conner has been promoted to boatswain and now outranks him.

Cast

Production

With the full cooperation of the US Navy, principal photography which ended early May 1934, took place at a number of naval facilities, including the Bremerton Navy yard, Washington, Naval Training Station, San Diego, California, as well as other locations in San Pedro and Sunnyvale, California. Naval personnel made up many of the extras on the film. Of historical interest is that a portion of the filming of Here Comes the Navy took place aboard the battleship , which was sunk by the Japanese on December 7, 1941, at Pearl Harbor. Further, portions of the film also include shots of the dirigible , a year before the accident that destroyed the airship with the loss of two crew.

Reception
In his review for The New York Times, film critic Frank Nugent described Here Comes the Navy as another of the films in "traditional Cagneyesque manner." "Some of the heartiest laughs of the current cinema season were recorded last night in the Strand Theatre, where "Here Comes the Navy" had its metropolitan première. A fast-moving comedy enriched by an authentic naval setting, this Warner production has the added advantage, in these parlous times, of being beyond censorial reproach."

Here Comes the Navy was nominated for the Academy Award for Best Picture.

Box office
According to Warner Bros records the film earned $1,183,000 domestically and $575,000 internationally.

References

Notes

Citations

Bibliography

 Smith, Richard K. The Airships Akron & Macon: Flying Aircraft Carriers of the United States Navy. Annapolis, Maryland: United States Naval Institute, 1965. .

External links

 
 
 
 

1934 films
1930s romantic comedy-drama films
American aviation films
American buddy comedy films
American romantic comedy-drama films
American black-and-white films
1930s English-language films
Films directed by Lloyd Bacon
Films about the United States Navy
Warner Bros. films
1930s buddy films
1930s American films